Brumby's Bakeries (commonly shortened to just Brumby's) is a chain of Australian and New Zealand  retail bakeries. It was established in Victoria in 1975 by Roger Gillespie (co-founder of Bakers Delight) with the opening of its first bakery, The Old Style Bread Centre, in Ashburton, Victoria.

Company information 
In 2003, the chain was listed on the Bendigo Stock Exchange.

On 18 December 2006, Brumby's announced Retail Food Group had proposed a merger.

As of 2007, Brumby's Bakeries has over 320 franchises throughout Australia and New Zealand, up from 280 in 2003.

In 2012 Brumby's Bakeries Managing Director wrote an internal memo that suggested franchisees increase their prices and "let the carbon tax take the blame".

The bakery chain is part of the publicly listed Retail Food Group, which also owns Gloria Jeans, Donut King, and Michel's Patisserie.

See also
 List of restaurant chains in Australia

References

External links
 

Food and drink companies based in Melbourne
Bakeries of Australia
Australian companies established in 1975